Hugh Perrett (born 6 April 1982, in Sydney) is a rugby union player who played for the  in Super Rugby. His playing position is Flanker. He made his debut in Super Rugby for the  during the 2012 Super Rugby season as an injury replacement.

Having previously been a member of the Waratahs squad, he joined the Rebels during the 2012 Super Rugby season as an injury replacement and went on to make 4 appearances that season before leaving the club.

Earlier in his career he represented English teams Sale Sharks and Bath Rugby make 10 appearances in total.

Perrett has also represented Eastwood Rugby Club, captaining the side in the Shute Shield. He has also represented the Greater Sydney Rams in the National Rugby Championship.

References

External links
ESPN Player Profile

1982 births
Australian rugby union players
Melbourne Rebels players
Sale Sharks players
Bath Rugby players
Greater Sydney Rams players
Rugby union flankers
Living people
New South Wales Waratahs players
Rugby union players from Sydney